Degtyarsk is a town under the administrative jurisdiction of the Town of Revda in Sverdlovsk Oblast, Russia, located on the Vyazovka River (right tributary of the Chusovaya),  west of Yekaterinburg, the administrative center of the oblast. Population:

History
It was founded in the 18th century; town status was granted to it in 1954.

The town is notable as the site of 1960 U-2 incident, where an American Lockheed U-2 reconnaissance aircraft (and pursuing Soviet MiG-19 'Farmer') were shot down by S-75 Dvina (SA-2 'Guideline') surface-to-air missiles.

Administrative and municipal status
Within the framework of the administrative divisions, Degtyarsk and ten rural localities are subordinated to the Town of Revda—an administrative unit with the status equal to that of the districts. As a municipal division, Degtyarsk, together with three rural localities, is incorporated as Degtyarsk Urban Okrug. Revda and the other seven rural localities are incorporated separately as Revda Urban Okrug.

References

Notes

Sources

External links

Official website of Degtyarsk 
Degtyarsk Business Directory 

Cities and towns in Sverdlovsk Oblast